Anthony Rudolph Ahlin (December 12, 1914 – May 6, 1976) was an American professional ice hockey left winger who played in one National Hockey League game for the Chicago Black Hawks during the 1937–38 NHL season.

See also
List of players who played only one game in the NHL

References

1914 births
1976 deaths
American men's ice hockey left wingers
Chicago Blackhawks players
Ice hockey players from Minnesota
Sportspeople from Eveleth, Minnesota
Kansas City Greyhounds players